Rosendale is a village in Fond du Lac County, Wisconsin, United States. The population was 1,063 at the 2010 census. The village is located partially within the Town of Rosendale and partially within the Town of Springvale.

History
The village was named for the wild rose bushes growing in a dale near the original town site.

Geography
Rosendale is located at  (43.80962, -88.673154).

Demographics

2010 census
As of the census of 2010, there were 1,063 people, 407 households, and 299 families living in the village. The racial makeup of the village was 96.0% White, 0.2% African American, 0.9% Native American, 0.4% Asian, 1.7% from other races, and 0.8% from two or more races. Hispanic or Latino of any race were 3.0% of the population.

There were 407 households, of which 36.9% had children under the age of 18 living with them, 61.4% were married couples living together, 8.4% had a female householder with no husband present, 3.7% had a male householder with no wife present, and 26.5% were non-families. 21.4% of all households were made up of individuals, and 11.5% had someone living alone who was 65 years of age or older. The average household size was 2.61 and the average family size was 3.07.

The median age in the village was 36.6 years. 27.8% of residents were under the age of 18; 6.8% were between the ages of 18 and 24; 27.9% were from 25 to 44; 25.6% were from 45 to 64; and 12% were 65 years of age or older. The gender makeup of the village was 48.5% male and 51.5% female.

2000 census
As of the census of 2000, there were 923 people, 325 households, and 261 families living in the village. The population density was 824.3 people per square mile (318.2/km2). There were 339 housing units at an average density of 302.7 per square mile (116.9/km2). The racial makeup of the village was 99.67% White, 0.11% Native American, and 0.22% from two or more races. 0.33% of the population were Hispanic or Latino of any race.

There were 325 households, out of which 42.2% had children under the age of 18 living with them, 71.1% were married couples living together, 6.5% had a female householder with no husband present, and 19.4% were non-families. 13.8% of all households were made up of individuals, and 7.4% had someone living alone who was 65 years of age or older. The average household size was 2.84 and the average family size was 3.15.

In the village, the population was spread out, with 29.4% under the age of 18, 9.1% from 18 to 24, 30.3% from 25 to 44, 22.5% from 45 to 64, and 8.7% who were 65 years of age or older. The median age was 34 years. For every 100 females, there were 94.7 males. For every 100 females age 18 and over, there were 97.6 males.

The median income for a household in the village was $52,448, and the median income for a family was $57,083. Males had a median income of $38,125 versus $26,250 for females. The per capita income for the village was $18,653. About 0.4% of families and 2.3% of the population were below the poverty line, including 3.8% of those under age 18 and none of those age 65 or over.

Transportation
Rosendale is located along Highways 23 and 26. Wis 23 heads west to Ripon and east to Fond du Lac. Wis 26 heads north to Oshkosh and south to Waupun. The junction of 23 and 26 was formerly controlled by stop signs, which caused long backups at peak traffic times but now has a traffic signal.

Rosendale has a reputation of being a speed trap with a police department that heavily enforces traffic laws.

National Register of Historic Places listings

Rosendale is home to Sisson's Peony Gardens, listed on the National Register of Historic Places. Open for public viewing, the gardens hold an annual Peony Sunday in early June.

The Rosendale Historical Society headquarters on Main Street has been used for a museum since 2001. It is housed in the former Independent Order of Odd Fellows Lodge No. 89 which was added to the National Register in 2016. The society houses collections about the history of the village and surrounding areas.

Images

References

External links 
 Village of Rosendale

Villages in Fond du Lac County, Wisconsin
Villages in Wisconsin